Steve Alcorn (born 1956) is an American entrepreneur, engineer, inventor, author and teacher best known for his involvement in the theme park industry. As a co-founder of MicroDaSys, he was an early pioneer of computer peripherals.

Biography
Born in 1956, Steve Alcorn graduated from the Harvard School for Boys, now Harvard-Westlake School, in 1973 and received a Bachelor of Science degree in engineering from UCLA in 1977. He was a Hughes Aircraft Company master's fellow from 1977 through 1979.

In 1982, he joined Walt Disney Imagineering (then known as WED Enterprises) as a consultant, where he worked on the electronic systems for Epcot Center. During his two years with Imagineering, he designed show control systems for The American Adventure, wrote the operating system used in the parkwide monitoring system, and became Imagineering's first Systems Engineer, heading up mechanical, electronic and software systems for the Journey into Imagination ride.

In 1985, he became Vice President of Engineering and later chief operating officer for Linn Electronics, the inventors of the digital drum machine. He reshaped the engineering department and assembled a team to work on the problem-plagued Linn 9000 drum machine, and designed the LinnSequencer and LinnDrum Midistudio.In 1986, he founded Alcorn McBride & Associates, predecessor to Alcorn McBride Inc. The company initially concentrated on providing engineering services to the music industry, designing products for Akai, 360 Systems and Forat Electronics. In 2010 the company was named to Inc Magazines fastest growing companies list for the third time. In 2016 the company celebrated its 30th anniversary.

In 1988, Mr. Alcorn designed the company's first show controller, the V16, which was used in Wonders of Life at Epcot, and later became the parkwide standard throughout most of the world's theme parks. He also directed the team that developed the "Digital Binloop" multi-track audio system that is used in nearly every major theme park attraction. In 2003, he won the Florida Governor's Award recognizing his "Digital Video Machine" high definition player as the year's best new product.

In 2016, the Orlando Business Journal named Alcorn McBride Inc. one of the Best Places to Work.  The recognition coincided with the company's 30th anniversary. As the largest manufacturer of audio, video and show control equipment for the theme park industry, the company is known for its employee-centric work environment.

In 2017, Mr. Alcorn was inducted into the SCN Hall of Fame.

He is the author of two books about the theme park industry: Building a Better Mouse (co-authored with David Green) and Theme Park Design

He is also the author of "How to Fix Your Novel," "Write Your Life Story," "Writing Young Adult Fiction" and fiction books including a mystery, two young adult novels and a children's book co-authored with his wife, Linda McBride Alcorn.

Through Internet instruction provider Education To Go, Mr. Alcorn teaches online classes at 1600 universities and colleges worldwide. His classes include "Write Fiction Like A Pro", "Mystery Writing", "Writing Young Adult Fiction", "Advanced Fiction Writing", "Writing for Children", and "Publish Your Book Now". In 2001 he founded The Writing Academy, an online learning website for authors.

For aspiring Imagineers, he teaches a class in "Imagineering" at Imagineeringclass.com

In a 2013 interview, Mr. Alcorn described the approach he takes to online learning.

In 2020 he was featured in Season 4 Episode 9 of Walter Isaacson's Trailblazers.

He has been married to his high school sweetheart, Linda McBride, since 1978. They have one child, Dani Alcorn.

Publications

References

External links
 Imagineering Class
 Alcorn McBride Inc.
 2010 Inc. 5000
 Ed2go 

1956 births
Living people
American technology executives
UCLA Henry Samueli School of Engineering and Applied Science alumni
Harvard-Westlake School alumni